The 2015 Phillips 66 National Swimming Championships were held from August 6 to 10, 2015, at the Northside Swim Center in San Antonio, Texas.

Men's events

Women's events

References

External links
 2015 Phillips 66 National Championships

United States Swimming National Championships
USA Swimming Championships
USA Swimming Championships
USA Swimming Championships
USA Swimming Championships